Arcangelo is a given name and a family name. Notable people with the name include:

S. Michele Arcangelo, archangel in Jewish, Christian, and Islamic teachings
Andrea di Cione Arcangelo (1308–1368), Italian painter, sculptor, and architect active in Florence
Antonio di Arcangelo, Italian painter, active in Florence in a Renaissance style, between 1520 and 1538
Arcangelo Califano (1730–1750), baroque composer and cellist
Arcangelo Placenza da Calatafimi, (1390–1460) venerated Italian Franciscan friar and preacher
Arcangelo Canetoli (1460–1513), venerated Catholic priest
Arcangelo Cascieri (1902–1997), influential sculptor, major figure in Boston Architectural College in Boston, Massachusetts
Arcangelo di Cola (active 1416–1429) Italian late-Gothic painter
Arcangelo Corelli (1653–1713), Italian violinist and composer of Baroque music
Arcangelo Ghisleri (1855–1938), geographer who created numerous maps of Africa
Arcangelo Guglielmelli (c. 1650 – 1723), Italian architect and painter from Naples
Arcangelo Madrignano (died 1529), Italian Catholic prelate and Bishop of Avellino e Frigento
Arcangelo Pinelli (born 1944), Italian fencer
Arcangelo Resani (1670–1740), Italian painter of the Baroque period
Arcangelo Salimbeni (c. 1536 – 1579), Italian Mannerist painter active in Sienna
Arcangelo Sannicandro (born 1943), Italian lawyer and politician from Apulia
Arcangelo Tadini (1846–1912), Catholic priest, beatified on 24 October 2001, canonized on 19 April 2009
Arcangelo Felice Assunta Wertmuller von Elgg (born 1928), Italian screenwriter and director professionally known as Lina Wertmüller
Arcangelo, a British classical ensemble led by cellist Jonathan Cohen (conductor)

See also
Chiesa di San Michele Arcangelo, church in Anacapri, Capri, Italy
San Michele Arcangelo (Volterra), 13th century Romanesque church in Volterra, Italy
Arc Angel (disambiguation)
Arc Angels
Arcangeli
Archangel
Archangelos (disambiguation)
Arkangel (disambiguation)

Italian masculine given names

it:Arcangelo
la:Arcangelo